Spyridium vexilliferum, commonly known as winged spyridium, or helicopter bush, is a species of flowering plant in the family Rhamnaceae and is endemic to south-eastern Australia. It is a small, low-lying to erect shrub with linear to narrowly elliptic leaves, and dense heads of small white flowers.

Description
The edges of the leaves are rolled under, the upper surface glabrous and shiny, the lower surface covered with whitish hairs or often obscured. Flowering mainly occurs from September to January.

Taxonomy
In 1834, William Jackson Hooker described Cryptandra vexillifera in The Journal of Botany from specimens collected at Port Dalrymple. In 1858, Siegfried Reissek changed the name to Spyridium vexilliferum in the journal Linnea. The specific epithet (vexilliferum) means "standard-bearing".

In 1863, George Bentham described S. vexilliferum var. latifolium in Flora Australiensis, and the name, and that of the autonym are accepted by the Australian Plant Census:
 Spyridium vexilliferum (Hook.)

Distribution and habitat
The variety vexilliferum grows in sandy heath, heathy woodland or mallee and on rocky outcrops from the Eyre Peninsula in South Australia to scattered locations in south-western Victoria and in the east, north and west of Tasmania. Variety latifolium is only known from south-eastern South Australia to the Portland area in south-western Victoria.

Conservation status
Spyridium vexilliferum var. vexilliferum is listed as "rare" in Tasmania under the Tasmanian Government Threatened Species Protection Act 1995.

References

vexilliferum
Rosales of Australia
Flora of South Australia
Flora of Tasmania
Flora of Victoria (Australia)
Plants described in 1834
Taxa named by William Jackson Hooker